Nobody Knows is the second studio album by musician Willis Earl Beal. It was released in September 2013 under XL Recordings.

Track listing

References

2013 albums
Willis Earl Beal albums
XL Recordings albums